Luis León Sánchez Gil (born 24 November 1983) is a Spanish road bicycle racer, who currently rides for UCI WorldTeam . Sánchez's major achievements include winning the overall classifications of the 2009 Paris–Nice and the 2005 Tour Down Under, as well as the one-day race Clásica de San Sebastián in 2010 and 2012. He also has four Tour de France stage victories and is a four-time winner of the Spanish National Time Trial Championships. He is a time trial specialist and has improved his climbing skills over the course of his career.

Personal life
Born in Mula, he is also known as Lulu Sánchez. León is not his surname but he carries it as a middle name as a mark of respect to his grandfather originally, but since late 2006 also as a tribute to his eldest brother, León Sánchez, who died in a motorbike accident. His younger brother, Pedro León, is a professional footballer, playing for Spanish team CF Fuenlabrada. His other brother, Antonio León Sánchez, plays indoor football. He is not related to fellow Spanish cyclist Samuel Sánchez.

Career

Early career
Sánchez rode for the  team from 2004 until 2006, with his major results being overall victories in the 2005 Tour Down Under, and podium positions in the 2006 Tour Down Under, and the 2006 Vuelta a Castilla y León.

Caisse d'Epargne (2007–10)

In 2007, he moved to the  team following the collapse of the  team in the wake of the Operación Puerto doping case. In his first season with the team, he won the Vuelta a Mallorca, and finished third in Paris–Nice after winning Stage 6.

The 2008 season saw Sánchez win another stage of Paris–Nice, this time finishing fifth overall. He claimed the Spanish National Time Trial Championships for the first time. He also rode his second Tour de France, and won Stage 7 after counterattacking, having been in a breakaway that was caught by the peloton.

Sánchez won the 2009 Tour Méditerranéen, and the following month won Paris–Nice after winning Stage 7 in a dominant fashion. He also won stages of the Tour of the Basque Country and the Tour du Haut Var, and took victory on Stage 8 of the Tour de France on his way to finishing 26th overall.

The 2010 season was Sánchez's most successful to date. He showed strong form in the early part of the season, finishing second in the Tour Down Under and winning the fifth stage. This was followed with another second place, in the Volta ao Algarve, after he won the final time trial. Sánchez attempted to defend his Paris–Nice title, but finished second overall, eleven seconds behind Alberto Contador. Sánchez then won the overall classification and a stage at the Circuit de la Sarthe in April. He recorded a fourth place in the Volta a Catalunya, and reclaimed his title at Spanish National Time Trial Championships. At the Tour de France, Sánchez finished second on Stage 9 after being in the breakaway, and went on to finish eleventh overall – later revised to tenth after Contador was stripped of the title – his best result to date in the Tour. Following the Tour, Sánchez took his biggest one-day race victory by winning the Clásica de San Sebastián. Sánchez also rode the Vuelta a España, and finished tenth overall after a strong final week.

Rabobank (2011–2013)

Sánchez joined Dutch team  for the 2011 season. Once again he won the Spanish National Time Trial Championships, and he also won Stage 9 of the Tour de France, but was unable to repeat his high overall placing of 2010, managing only 57th overall. Likewise, he rode the Vuelta a España and finished 53rd overall.

Remaining with  into 2012, Sánchez won Stage 6 of Paris–Nice after a long breakaway with veteran Jens Voigt, his fourth stage victory in the event. He also won two consecutive stages of the Tour de Romandie; on the first of these, he took the win over 's Gianni Meersman, almost pushing him in the barriers on the right side, but the commissaires judged the sprint to be legal. He led the race going into the final time trial, but put in a poor ride and dropped to tenth overall. Sánchez won the Spanish National Time Trial Championships again, and he won  Stage 14 of the Tour de France, which included two category 1 climbs. Sánchez came close to a second victory on Stage 18 after he and Nicolas Roche attacked from the peloton in the final  overhauled the breakaway group and looked to have held off the chasing peloton only for Mark Cavendish to sprint past the pair in the final . On the following stage, Sánchez set the third fastest time in the time trial, with only the final two riders to set a time, Chris Froome and Bradley Wiggins, beating Sánchez.

Sánchez was selected to represent Spain in the Olympic Games in both the road race and the time trial. His time trial was wrecked by two mechanical problems, including losing his chain as he left the start ramp. He went on to win the Clásica de San Sebastián, with a strong solo attack over the closing kilometres, while his teammates Mollema and Gesink disrupted the chase. He resisted to the peloton's return during his  solo ordeal, never getting more than 20 seconds of an advantage over the group.

In 2013, Rabobank left cycling as a sponsor and the team became . At the beginning of February, the team decided to suspend Sánchez indefinitely, saying that they will investigate the past relationship between the rider and Eufemiano Fuentes, a doctor under trial for providing athletes with doping substances and performing blood transfusions. After a few weeks, Sánchez was reinstated in the team, and returned to race in the Tour of Belgium, where he won a stage. Sánchez planned to skip the Tour de France and focus on the Vuelta a España.

Caja Rural (2014)
In October 2013,  announced that Sánchez would be dropped from the team as a result of accusations linking him to the Operación Puerto doping case. In December, it was announced that Sánchez would join the  team for 2014.

Astana (2015–2021)
In August 2014,  announced that they had signed Sánchez on an initial one-year deal for the 2015 season.

In June 2015, he competed in the inaugural European Games, for Spain in cycling. He earned a gold medal in the road race and a bronze in the time trial.

Team Bahrain Victorious

Major results

1999
 2nd Road race, National Junior Road Championships
2000
 2nd Road race, National Junior Road Championships
2001
 2nd Time trial, National Junior Road Championships
2004
 1st Stage 3 (ITT) Clásica Internacional de Alcobendas
 1st Stage 1 Vuelta a Asturias
 2nd Time trial, National Road Championships
 5th Circuito de Getxo
 10th Overall Circuit de la Sarthe
2005
 1st  Overall Tour Down Under
1st  Young rider classification
1st Stage 3
 1st Stage 3 (ITT) Clásica Internacional de Alcobendas
 4th Overall Three Days of De Panne
2006
 1st  Young rider classification, Paris–Nice
 2nd Overall Tour Down Under
 2nd Overall Vuelta a Castilla y León
 3rd Overall Three Days of De Panne
2007
 1st  Overall Vuelta a Mallorca
2nd Trofeo Sóller
5th Trofeo Pollença
 2nd Time trial, National Road Championships
 3rd Overall Paris–Nice
1st Stage 6
 7th Overall Volta a la Comunitat Valenciana
2008
 1st  Time trial, National Road Championships
 Tour de France
1st Stage 7
 Combativity award Stage 7
 3rd Overall Critérium International
 5th Overall Paris–Nice
1st Stage 7
 8th Overall Tour Down Under
2009
 1st  Overall Paris–Nice
1st Stage 7
 1st  Overall Tour Méditerranéen
 1st Stage 8 Tour de France
 1st Stage 1 Tour du Haut Var
 2nd Time trial, National Road Championships
 5th Overall Tour of the Basque Country
1st Stage 1
 6th Overall Tour de Picardie
 6th GP Ouest–France
 8th Clásica de Almería
2010
 1st  Time trial, National Road Championships
 1st  Overall Circuit de la Sarthe
1st Stage 1
 1st Clásica de San Sebastián
 2nd Overall Volta ao Algarve
1st Stage 5 (ITT)
 2nd Overall Tour Down Under
1st Stage 5
 2nd Overall Paris–Nice
 3rd UCI World Ranking
 4th Overall Volta a Catalunya
 4th Clásica de Almería
 7th Time trial, UCI Road World Championships
 9th Overall Tour de France
 9th Overall Vuelta a España
2011
 1st  Time trial, National Road Championships
 1st Stage 9 Tour de France
 6th Overall Tour of Beijing
 8th Overall Volta ao Algarve
2012
 1st  Time trial, National Road Championships
 1st Clásica de San Sebastián
 1st Stage 14 Tour de France
 1st Stage 6 Paris–Nice
 1st Stage 2 Vuelta a Castilla y León
 10th Overall Tour de Romandie
1st Stages 3 & 4
2013
 National Road Championships
2nd Time trial
3rd Road race
 2nd Overall Tour of Belgium
1st Stage 5
 2nd Overall Tour de l'Ain
1st Stage 3
2014
 Vuelta a España
1st  Mountains classification
 Combativity award Stages 13, 14, 16 & 18
 1st Stage 3 Vuelta a Castilla y León
 2nd Overall La Tropicale Amissa Bongo
1st Stage 1
 2nd Prueba Villafranca de Ordizia
 3rd Overall Vuelta a Andalucía
 4th Road race, National Road Championships
 8th Overall Tour of Turkey
 8th Trofeo Serra de Tramuntana
2015
 European Games
1st  Road race
3rd  Time trial
 1st Stage 2 (TTT) Vuelta a Burgos
 4th Time trial, National Road Championships
 5th Overall Volta ao Algarve
 5th Vuelta a Murcia
2016
 1st Stage 1 Tour of the Basque Country
 1st Stage 2 Volta ao Algarve
 2nd Overall Volta a la Comunitat Valenciana
 4th Vuelta a Murcia
 10th Road race, UEC European Road Championships
  Combativity award Stage 9 Vuelta a España
2017
 1st Gran Premio Bruno Beghelli
 4th Overall Volta ao Algarve
2018
 1st Vuelta a Murcia
 2nd Overall Volta a la Comunitat Valenciana
 4th Road race, National Road Championships
 4th Overall Tour of Almaty
1st Stage 2
 5th Overall Vuelta a Andalucía
 5th Overall Route d'Occitanie
 8th Overall Tour of the Alps
1st Stage 4
 8th Overall Tour Down Under
 8th Overall Tour of Guangxi
2019
 1st  Overall Vuelta a Murcia
1st  Points classification
1st Stage 2
 1st Stage 2 Tour de Suisse
 1st Stage 1 (TTT) Vuelta a España
 2nd Road race, National Road Championships
 2nd GP Miguel Induráin
 4th Overall Tour Down Under
 9th Overall Paris–Nice
 10th Cadel Evans Great Ocean Road Race
2020
 National Road Championships
1st  Road race
2nd Time trial
 1st Stage 2 Vuelta a Murcia
2021
 1st Prueba Villafranca de Ordizia
 3rd GP Miguel Induráin
 8th Circuito de Getxo
2022
 7th Overall Volta a la Comunitat Valenciana
  Combativity award Stage 14 Vuelta a España

General classification results timeline

References

External links

 
 
 
 
 
 
 
 
 
 

1983 births
Living people
Spanish male cyclists
Spanish Tour de France stage winners
Spanish people of French descent
Cyclists at the 2012 Summer Olympics
Olympic cyclists of Spain
People from Río Mula
2012 Tour de France stage winners
2011 Tour de France stage winners
European Games medalists in cycling
European Games bronze medalists for Spain
European Games gold medalists for Spain
Cyclists from the Region of Murcia
Tour de Suisse stage winners